Qi County, also known by its Chinese name Qixian, is a county in the central part of Shanxi Province, China. It is under the administration of the prefecture-level city of Jinzhong and has a population of approximately 265,310.

The county is on the route of the Datong-Puzhou Railway, the primary axial railway of Shanxi Province, which links it to Datong (approximately 7.5 hours) and the provincial capital Taiyuan (approximately 1.5 hours away).

The county seat, also named Qixian, is designated as a National Historic and Cultural City. The county is home to the Qiao & Qu Family Compounds and is nearby the UNESCO World Heritage Site of Pingyao.

Climate

References

External links
www.xzqh.org 

County-level divisions of Shanxi
Jinzhong